William Francis Buckland (8 August 1847 – 29 December 1915) was a 19th-century Member of Parliament in New Zealand, an independent conservative MP and cricketer.

Life and career
Buckland was born in Auckland in 1847, a son of William Buckland. John Buckland was an elder brother. Frank Buckland received private tuition, and attended Parnell Grammar School and St John's College. He trained as a civil engineer and was employed by the engineer's department of the Auckland Provincial Council, before joining the Colonial Survey as a surveyor. He then became mine manager in Thames. He also trained in law and was called to the bar in 1884.

Buckland held various public offices in Remuera between 1873 and 1880. He was beaten by Captain Benjamin Harris, who had since  been one of the two members of the  electorate, by just two votes. Early in 1882, Buckland petitioned to the courts against the election on various grounds. The case was heard by the Chief Justice, James Prendergast, and Justice Gillies, who declared the election void. Buckland and Harris contested the resulting , which was won by Harris by 529 votes to 499. Buckland then represented the Manukau electorate from 1890, when he defeated long-term MP Maurice O'Rorke. In 1893, O'Rorke defeated him in turn.

He was mayor of Cambridge 1898–1903 and 1905–1910. He practised law in Cambridge.

Buckland also played seven first-class cricket matches for Auckland between 1873 and 1883. In 1873 he organised the first tour by a New Zealand provincial team, when over three weeks in November and December Auckland played in Dunedin, Christchurch, Wellington and Nelson, winning all four matches. At the time he was described as a batsman with "a true eye and capital nerve" and a destructive fast bowler with "good lasting powers".

He died on 29 December 1915 at his son's house "Mona Vale" in Cambridge. His wife had died before him.

See also
 List of Auckland representative cricketers

References

Sources

1847 births
1915 deaths
Members of the New Zealand House of Representatives
Mayors of places in Waikato
People from Cambridge, New Zealand
New Zealand MPs for North Island electorates
19th-century New Zealand lawyers
People educated at St John's College, Auckland
Unsuccessful candidates in the 1881 New Zealand general election
Unsuccessful candidates in the 1887 New Zealand general election
Unsuccessful candidates in the 1893 New Zealand general election
Unsuccessful candidates in the 1896 New Zealand general election
Unsuccessful candidates in the 1899 New Zealand general election
New Zealand surveyors
New Zealand cricketers
Auckland cricketers
Cricketers from Auckland
19th-century New Zealand politicians
19th-century New Zealand engineers
New Zealand civil engineers
Frank